Dharwad South Lok Sabha constituency was a former Lok Sabha (parliamentary) constituency in Karnataka state in southern India. With the implementation of the delimitation of parliamentary constituencies in 2008, it ceased to exist.

Assembly segments
Dharwad South Lok Sabha constituency comprised the following eight Legislative Assembly segments:
 Kundgol
 Shiggaon
 Hanagal
 Hirekerur
 Ranibennur
 Byadgi
 Haveri
 Shirhatti

Members of Parliament
1952: Thimmappa Rudrappa Newsi, Indian National Congress
1957: Thimmappa Rudrappa Newsi, Indian National Congress
1962: Fakruddinsab Hussensab Mohsin, Indian National Congress
1967: Fakruddinsab Hussensab Mohsin, Indian National Congress
1971: Fakruddinsab Hussensab Mohsin, Indian National Congress
1977: Fakruddinsab Hussensab Mohsin, Indian National Congress
1980: Fakruddinsab Hussensab Mohsin, Indian National Congress
1984: Azeez Sait, Indian National Congress
1989: B. M. Mujahid, Indian National Congress
1991: B. M. Mujahid, Indian National Congress
1996: I.G. Sanadi, Indian National Congress
1998: I.G. Sanadi, Indian National Congress
1999: I.G. Sanadi, Indian National Congress
2004: Manjunath Kunnur, Bharatiya Janata Party
2008 onwards:Constituency does not exist

See Dharwad Lok Sabha constituency and Haveri Lok Sabha constituency

See also
 Dharwad district
 Dharwad Lok Sabha constituency
 Dharwad North Lok Sabha constituency
 Haveri district
 Haveri Lok Sabha constituency
 List of former constituencies of the Lok Sabha

References

Former constituencies of the Lok Sabha
2008 disestablishments in India
Constituencies disestablished in 2008
Former Lok Sabha constituencies of Karnataka